Cassopolis is a village in the U.S. state of Michigan and the county seat of Cass County.  It is located mostly in LaGrange Township with a small portion extending east into Penn Township.  The village and county are named after statesman Lewis Cass, a New Hampshire native and a prominent U.S. senator from Michigan prior to the American Civil War.

Diamond Lake, one of the 100 largest inland lakes in Michigan, is located in Cassopolis.

Cassopolis is part of the South Bend–Mishawaka, IN-MI, Metropolitan Statistical Area sometimes referred to as Michiana. The population was 1,774 at the 2010 census. Cassopolis was platted by European Americans in 1831.  It had already been designated the county seat by that point.  It was incorporated as a village in 1863. The county developed farming and some industry.

Cassopolis was a transit point on the Underground Railroad, by which sympathizers aided refugee slaves from the South to gain freedom in the North and in Canada. Some refugees continued through Michigan to settle in Canada in order to avoid risk under the 1850 Fugitive Slave Law, which increased incentives for capture. However the 1850s also saw the settlement of many African-Americans and people of mixed African-American and Sapponi and Pumenkey ancestry in Cass County.

In the 1960s, a group of African Americans connected to the Nation of Islam acquired some 1,000 acres of farmland in the area. Work on this acquisition was overseen by a man who had graduated from Cassopolis High.

Geography

Cassopolis is the town associated with Diamond Lake, the largest lake in southwestern Michigan.

Transportation

Demographics

2010 census
As of the census of 2010, there were 1,774 people, 709 households, and 384 families residing in the village. The racial makeup of the village was 60.0% White, 29.3% African American, 1.1% Native American, 2.4% Asian, 0.1% Pacific Islander, 1.5% from other races, and 5.6% from two or more races. Hispanic or Latino of any race were 4.5% of the population.

There were 709 households, of which 32.9% had children under the age of 18 living with them, 31.5% were married couples living together, 15.8% had a female householder with no husband present, 6.9% had a male householder with no wife present, and 45.8% were non-families. 40.8% of all households were made up of individuals, and 17.7% had someone living alone who was 65 years of age or older. The average household size was 2.32 and the average family size was 3.15.

The median age in the village was 35.4 years. 25.5% of residents were under the age of 18; 10.5% were between the ages of 18 and 24; 28.1% were from 25 to 44; 22.8% were from 45 to 64; and 13.4% were 65 years of age or older. The gender makeup of the village was 50.3% male and 49.7% female.

2000 census
As of the census of 2000, there were 1,740 people, 703 households, and 437 families residing in the village. The racial makeup of the village was 54.60% White, 32.59% African American, 0.57% Native American, 3.62% Asian, 0.80% from other races, and 7.82% from two or more races. Hispanic or Latino of any race were 2.18% of the population.

There were 703 households, out of which 33.4% had children under the age of 18 living with them, 40.4% were married couples living together, 16.6% had a female householder with no husband present, and 37.7% were non-families. 33.9% of all households were made up of individuals, and 11.8% had someone living alone who was 65 years of age or older.  The average household size was 2.47 and the average family size was 3.13.

In the village, the age distribution of the population shows 30.0% under the age of 18, 8.7% from 18 to 24, 29.0% from 25 to 44, 21.1% from 45 to 64, and 11.1% who were 65 years of age or older.  The median age was 34 years. For every 100 females, there were 89.3 males.  For every 100 females age 18 and over, there were 83.2 males.

The median income for a household in the village was $28,696, and the median income for a family was $37,348. Males had a median income of $29,688 versus $21,036 for females. The per capita income for the village was $14,359.  About 9.4% of families and 13.9% of the population were below the poverty line, including 13.8% of those under age 18 and 13.5% of those age 65 or over.

Schools
Cassopolis Public School District is the school system for the Village of Cassopolis and its surrounding areas. The district's schools are Ross Beatty Junior/Senior High School and Sam Adams Elementary.

Library
The Cass District Library's Main Library is located in Cassopolis.  The Local History Branch is also located in Cassopolis.  Other branches include the Howard Branch, Edwardsburg Branch, and the Mason / Union Branch.

Notable people

 Dennis Archer, 67th Mayor of Detroit; Michigan Supreme Court justice; president of the American Bar Association; grew up in Cassopolis
 Ruth Alice Armstrong, social activist
 Lieutenant Colonel Don Makay, current Battalion Commander; 69th Infantry Regiment (New York) born and grew up in Cassopolis
 Iven Kincheloe, test pilot and aviation pioneer, grew up in Cassopolis
 Kevin Loder, small forward and shooting guard for the Kansas City Kings, and San Diego Clippers; born in Cassopolis
 Ed Lowe, inventor of cat litter; grew up in Cassopolis.

References

External links

Cass County Government website
Cassopolis Webcam — view from the Cassopolis courthouse
Diamond Lake Diamond Lake Association

Villages in Cass County, Michigan
Villages in Michigan
County seats in Michigan
South Bend – Mishawaka metropolitan area
Populated places established in 1831
1831 establishments in Michigan Territory